Victor Michiels (born 6 January 1906, date of death unknown) was a Belgian footballer. He played in one match for the Belgium national football team in 1928.

References

External links
 

1906 births
Year of death missing
Belgian footballers
Belgium international footballers
Place of birth missing
Association footballers not categorized by position